Thai or THAI may refer to:
 Of or from Thailand, a country in Southeast Asia
 Thai people, the dominant ethnic group of Thailand
 Thai language, a Tai-Kadai language spoken mainly in and around Thailand
 Thai script
 Thai (Unicode block)

People with the name 
 Thai (surname), a Vietnamese version of Cai, including a list of people with the name
 Thai Lee (born 1958), an American businesswoman
 Thai Nguyen, US-based Vietnamese fashion designer and television personality

Other uses
 Thai (cannabis), a name for the drug
 Thai Airways, the national airline of Thailand
 Thai cat, a breed of cat
 Thai, a month in the Tamil calendar
 Toe to Heel Air Injection (THAI), a method of extracting oil from oil sands

See also
 
 Dai (disambiguation)
 Tai (disambiguation)
 Tay (disambiguation)
 Thais (disambiguation)
 Thay (disambiguation)
 Tie (disambiguation)
 Siam (disambiguation)
 Tai peoples or Thai peoples, the ethnic groups of southern China and Southeast Asia
 Thai tea or "cha-yen", a drink made from black tea

Language and nationality disambiguation pages